The 2013–14 season is the 104th season of competitive football in Germany.

Promotion and relegation

Pre Season

Post Season

National teams

Germany national football team

2014 FIFA World Cup qualification

Germany secured qualification for the 2014 World Cup on  after defeating Ireland 3–0 in Cologne.

2014 FIFA World Cup

Group stage

Knockout stage

Friendly matches

Germany women's national football team

UEFA Women's Euro 2013

2015 FIFA Women's World Cup qualification

Algarve Cup

Friendly matches

League season

Men

Bundesliga

Bundesliga review
After the first round of matches, Hertha BSC was in first place and Eintracht Frankfurt was in 18th place. After 17 rounds, the season reached its halfway mark. Bayern Munich were in first place seven points ahead of second place Bayer Leverkusen.  1. FC Nürnberg and Eintracht Braunschweig were in the automatic relegation spots with 11 points each. Bayern Munich clinched their 24th championship after the 27th round of matches when they led second place Borussia Dortmund by 25 points. The final matches of the season were played on   A 1–4 defeat to Schalke 04 confirmed relegation for Nürnberg on the final day of the season. Eintracht Braunschweig were relegated after a 1–3 loss to 1899 Hoffenheim on the final day. Despite losing 2–3 to FSV Mainz 05 on the final day, Hamburger SV still have a chance of remaining in the Bundesliga when they face SpVgg Greuther Fürth in the relegation play-offs. VfL Wolfsburg's defeat of Borussia Mönchengladbach secured a spot for the Wolves in the 2014–15 UEFA Europa League group stage. Gladbach's defeat meant they would be placed in the 2014–15 UEFA Europa League play-off round. Mainz will be competing in the 2014–15 UEFA Europa League third qualifying round due to their victory over Hamburg. Bundesliga champions Bayern Munich, runners-up Borussia Dortmund, and third placed Schalke 04 will all enter the 2014–15 UEFA Champions League group stage. Bayer Leverksuen, who finished in fourth place, will enter the 2014–15 UEFA Champions League play-off round. The first leg of the relegation play-offs between 16th placed Hamburg and Greuther Fürth who placed 3rd in the 2. Bundesliga was played on 15 May. It ended as a goalless draw. The second leg was played on 18 May. Greuther Fürth hosted Hamburg in the second leg of the play-off. Pierre-Michel Lasogga scored the first goal of the match to give Hamburg a 1–0 lead. Stephan Fürstner scored for Fürth to make the score 1–1. The aggregate score over the two legs was 1–1. Hamburg remained in the Bundesliga thanks to the away goals rule.

Bundesliga standings

2. Bundesliga

3. Liga

Women

Bundesliga

Standings

2. Bundesliga

North standings

South standings

DFB–Pokal

The 2013–14 DFB-Pokal had sixty-four teams participate in the competition.  Participants included all clubs from the 2012–13 Bundesliga and 2012–13 2. Bundesliga, except Dynamo Dresden who were banned from this season's competition.  The best four teams of the 2012–13 3. Liga and twenty-five teams from the twenty-one regional associations completed the entrants to the tournament.  The first round matches were played from 2 August to 5 August.  SC Wiedenbrück 2000 were the only 4th division club to make it past the first round.  They were paired with 2. Bundesliga side SV Sandhausen.  Only two matches in the second round were between Bundesliga clubs.  The second round matches were played on 24 and 25 September.  1. FC Saarbrücken were the only third division club to make it to the third round.  They were drawn against Bundesliga side Borussia Dortmund.  The third round matches were played on 3 and 4 December.  After the third round, 1. FC Kaiserslautern were the last 2. Bundesliga club in the competition.  They were paired with Bayer Leverkusen.  The quarter-finals were played on 11 and 12 February.  Kaiserslautern beat Leverkusen in the quarter-finals to be the only 2. Bundesliga club in the semi-finals along with three Bundesliga clubs.  Title holders Bayern Munich were paired with Kaiserslautern and last season's runners-up Borussia Dortmund were paired with VfL Wolfsburg in the semi-finals.  The semi-finals matches were played on 15 and 16 April.  Bayern Munich and Borussia Dortmund played each other in the 2014 DFB-Pokal Final on 17 May.  After 90 minutes of regulation time, no goals had been scored.  Extra time was needed for the first time since 1992 to decide a winner.  Goals from Arjen Robben and Thomas Müller during extra time gave Bayern Munich a 2–0 victory.  This title, along with the Bundesliga title, completed a domestic double for Bayern.

German clubs in Europe

Champions League

For the first time, four German clubs made it through the group stage into the Round of 16.  Bayern Munich, Bayer Leverkusen, Borussia Dortmund, and Schalke 04 all qualified for the knockout stage.

Bayer Leverkusen

Bayer Leverkusen finished third in the 2012–13 Bundesliga which led to a berth in the Champions League group stage. The group-stage draw on  saw Leverkusen placed in Group A along with Manchester United, Real Sociedad and Shakhtar Donetsk. On , Manchester United defeated Leverkusen 2–4 at Old Trafford. Simon Rolfes and Ömer Toprak scored for Leverkusen. The match on  saw goals from Rolfes and Jens Hegeler lead to a 2–1 win over Real Sociedad at BayArena. The match at BayArena against Manchester United on  resulted in a 0–5 loss. This win plus a win by Manchester United over Shakhtar Donetsk led to a second-place finish in Group A and advancement to the Round of 16.

Bayer Leverkusen were drawn against Paris Saint-Germain. PSG scored four goals before Leverkusen were reduced to ten men in the 59th minute when Emir Spahić received a second yellow card. PSG later scored two goals resulting in a 1–2 defeat for Leverkusen. The aggregate score of 1–6 saw Bayer Leverkusen eliminated from the competition.

Bayern Munich

Bayern Munich won both the 2012–13 Bundesliga and 2012–13 UEFA Champions League and was given a berth in the Champions League group stage. The group-stage draw on  saw Bayern placed in Group D with CSKA Moscow, Manchester City and Viktoria Plzeň. Bayern's first match took place on  against CSKA Moscow. Goals from David Alaba, Mario Mandžukić, and Arjen Robben resulted in a 3–0 victory for Bayern at Allianz Arena. Franck Ribéry, Thomas Müller and Robben scored the goals for Bayern and Jérôme Boateng earned a red card leaving Bayern with 10 men from the 86th minute. Bastian Schweinsteiger, Mario Götze and Alaba contributed one goal each while Ribéry scored two goals. On  Bayern defeated Viktoria Plzeň at Doosan Arena by a score of 1–0. Mandžukić scored the game's only goal. Bayern secured its place in the round of 16 with this win and a win by Manchester City over CSKA Moscow. This win was Bayern's ninth consecutive win in Champions League play which tied a record with Barcelona. This win set a new record undefeated streak in Champions League play at ten games. Bayern's goals were scored by Müller and Götze. The win was not enough for Manchester City to take over first place in Group D from Bayern Munich. This loss ended Bayern's record win streak end at ten games.

Bayern Munich were drawn against Arsenal. During the 8th minute, Manuel Neuer stopped a penalty kick from Arsenal's Mesut Özil. Wojciech Szczęsny was sent-off in the 37th minute after taking down Arjen Robben in the penalty area. David Alaba missed the penalty kick that followed. A goal scored by Toni Kroos in the 54th minute and one scored by Thomas Müller in the 88th minute gave Bayern a 2–0 victory. Schweinsteiger scored a goal in the 54th minute to give Bayern the lead before Lukas Podolski tied the game in the 57th minute. Bayern Munich advanced with a 3–1 aggregate score.

Nemanja Vidić scored for United in the 58th minute. Bastian Schweinsteiger scored for Bayern in the 66th minute. The game ended as a 1–1 draw. Patrice Evra of Manchester United scored the first goal of the match in the 57th minute. This lead lasted for 22 seconds before Mandžukić scored Bayern's first goal. Müller and Robben also scored for Bayern resulting in a 3–1 victory. An aggregate score of 4–2 saw Bayern advance to the semi-finals.

Sergio Ramos and Cristiano Ronaldo both scored two goals for Real Madrid. The aggregate score of 0–5 saw Bayern eliminated from the competition.

Borussia Dortmund

Borussia Dortmund finished as runners-up in the 2012–13 Bundesliga which earned a berth in the Champions League group stage. The group-stage draw on  saw Dortmund placed in Group F with Arsenal, Marseille and Napoli. Roman Weidenfeller earned a red card in stoppage time of the first half leaving Dortmund a man short for the second half of the game. Dortmand got its first win of the group stage on  against Marseille at Signal Iduna Park by a score of 3–0. Manager Jürgen Klopp was banned from the sideline after an incident with the fourth official in the first match. Robert Lewandowski scored two goals, including one penalty, and Marco Reus scored the other goal. Henrik Mkhitaryan scored the first goal in the 16th minute and Lewandowski scored the game winner in the 82nd minute. Dortmund returned to winning ways on  against Napoli by winning 3–1 at Signal Iduna Park. Dortmund's goals came from a Reus penalty, as well as goals from Jakub Błaszczykowski and Pierre-Emerick Aubameyang. Dortmund won the match 2–1 due to goals from Lewandowski and Kevin Großkreutz. This win moved Dortmund to first place in the group.

Borussia Dortmund were drawn against Zenit Saint Petersburg. Mkhitaryan scored in the fourth minute, Reus scored in the fifth minute and Lewandowski scored in the 61st and 71st minutes. Zenit won the match 2–1. Sebastian Kehl's goal in the 38th minute was the only one scored for Dortmund. Dortmund advanced to the quarter-finals due to an aggregate score of 5–4.

Real Madrid won the match 3–0 due to goals from Gareth Bale, Isco, and Cristiano Ronaldo. Despite the victory, the aggregate score of 2–3 saw Real Madrid advance instead of Borussia Dortmund.

Schalke 04

Schalke 04 finished in fourth place in the 2012–13 Bundesliga, which earned them a berth in the Champions League play-off round. On , however, Metalist were banned from UEFA competition. PAOK were chosen to replace Metalist in the play-off round and face Schalke. It ended as a 1–1 draw with Jefferson Farfán scoring for Schalke. The second leg was played at Toumba Stadium on  resulting in a 3–2 win for Schalke despite a red card for Jermaine Jones in the 64th minute. Julian Draxler scored one goal and Ádám Szalai scored two goals including the game winner which was scored in the 90th minute. The aggregate score of 4–3 saw Schalke advance to the group stage.

Schalke won the match 3–0 due to goals from Atsuto Uchida, Kevin-Prince Boateng, and Julian Draxler. On , Schalke defeated Basel 1–0 at St. Jakob-Park due to a goal from Draxler. Two second half goals scored by Draxler and Joël Matip gave Schalke a 2–0 win over a Basel team reduced to ten men after a 31st minute red card for Ivan Ivanov. This win put Schalke two points above Basel in second place in the group therefore advancing to the round of 16.

Schalke 04 were drawn against Real Madrid. Real Madrid won the match 6–1 with Schalke's only goal coming from Klaas-Jan Huntelaar. Tim Hoogland scored for Schalke in the 31st minute, however Real Madrid won the match 3–1. The aggregate score of 2–9 saw Schalke eliminated from the competition.

Europa League

Three German clubs participated in the 2013–14 UEFA Europa League.  They were Eintracht Frankfurt, SC Freiburg, and VfB Stuttgart.  Stuttgart was eliminated from the competition in the play-off round.  Freiburg was eliminated after finishing third in their group during the group stage.  Eintracht Frankfurt was eliminated the round of 32.

Eintracht Frankfurt

Eintracht Frankfurt finished 6th in the 2012–13 Bundesliga which earned a berth in the 2013–14 UEFA Europa League play-off round. Frankfurt won the match 2–0 with both goals scored by Alexander Meier. Meier and Takashi Inui both scored on goal in the match. The aggregate score of 4–1 moved Frankfurt on to the group stage.

Goals from Václav Kadlec, Marco Russ and Constant Djakpa resulted in a 3–0 win for Frankfurt. Bordeaux were reduced to ten men in the 62nd minute when Lucas Orban received a red card, however Frankfurt did not extend their lead. On , Frankfurt defeated APOEL 3–0 at GSP Stadium. The match's goals were scored by Srđan Lakić and Sebastian Jung along with an own goal from Nektarios Alexandrou. The win streak continued on  against Maccabi Tel Aviv at Commerzbank-Arena. Kadlec scored in the 12th minute. Maccabi Tel Aviv was reduced to ten men after a red card for Tal Ben Haim in the 34th minute. Meier added another goal in the 53rd minute. The only loss of the group stage came on  against Maccabi Tel Aviv at Bloomfield Stadium. Goals from Lakić and Meier were not enough as Frankfurt were defeated 2–4. The match's only goal was scored by Martin Lanig. This win and a draw by Maccabi Tel Aviv against APOEL made Frankfurt group winners with one match remaining. Goals from Stephan Schröck and Constant Djakpa led to a 2–0 victory for Frankfurt. The first-place finish in the group stage allowed Frankfurt to move on to the round of 32.

Eintracht Frankfurt were drawn against Porto. After trailing 0–2, a goal from Joselu in the 72nd minute and an own goal from Alex Sandro finished the match a 2–2 draw. The match ended as a 3–3 draw. Stefan Aigner contributed one goal for Frankfurt and Meier scored the other two. Frankfurt were eliminated due to the away goals rule due to Porto having three away goals to Frankfurt's two.

SC Freiburg

SC Freiburg finished 5th in the 2012–13 Bundesliga which earned a berth in the 2013–14 UEFA Europa League group stage. Julian Schuster scored a penalty kick and Admir Mehmedi scored the other goal for Freiburg. Karim Guédé of Freiburg earned a red card in the 77th minute and Serhiy Rybalka of Slovan Liberec earned a red card in at the 90+1 minute mark. The second matchday on  ended with a 0–2 defeat to Sevilla at Ramón Sánchez Pizjuán Stadium. Freiburg was reduced to ten men after Diagné Fallou earned a red card in the 62nd minute after which Sevilla scored both goals of the match. Vladimír Darida scored the goal for Freiburg in this match. Two Freiburg players were sent off during the match:  Nicolas Höfler in the 87th minute and Guédé in the 89th minute. The only win of the campaign came for Freiburg on  against Slovan Liberec at Stadion u Nisy. Goals from Matthias Ginter and Francis Coquelin resulted in a 2–1 for Freiburg. This loss combined with a win by Slovan Liberec over Estoril left Freiburg in third place in the group and eliminated from the competition.

VfB Stuttgart

VfB Stuttgart were runners-up to Champions League qualified Bayern Munich in the 2012–13 DFB-Pokal therefore earning a berth in the 2013–14 UEFA Europa League third qualifying round. The match ended in a 1–1 draw with Vedad Ibišević scoring Stuttgart's goal. The aggregate score was tied 1–1. Via the away goals rule, Stuttgart advanced to the play-off round.

Despite a goal by Ibišević in the 89th minute the match ended as a 1–2 defeat for Stuttgart. The aggregate score of 3–4 eliminated Stuttgart from the competition.

Managerial changes

Notes
 Announced on 16 January 2013.
 Announced on 15 May 2013.

Transfers
List of German football transfers summer 2013
List of German football transfers winter 2013–14

Deaths
 19 July 2013 – Bert Trautmann, 89, manager for Preußen Münster and SC Opel Rüsselsheim.
 2 August 2013 – Kurt Ehrmann, 91, forward for Karlsruher FV, VfB Mühlburg, and 1. FC Pforzheim who earned one cap for Germany.
 7 September 2013 – Wolfgang Frank, 62, striker for VfB Stuttgart, Eintracht Braunschweig, Borussia Dortmund, and others. He was also manager for 1. FSV Mainz 05, MSV Duisburg, Kickers Offenbach and others.
 15 March 2014 – Jürgen Kurbjuhn, 73, defender for Hamburger SV and member of 1962 West Germany World Cup squad.
 4 April 2014 – Klaus Meyer, 76, defender for Eintracht Braunschweig.
 1 May 2014 – Georg Stollenwerk, 83, midfielder for 1. FC Köln and member of 1958 West Germany World Cup squad.

Retirements

Mid-season
 Steve Cherundolo, 35, captain for Hannover 96 who won 87 caps for United States retired 19 March 2014.
 Jens Wissing, 26, defender who made three Bundesliga appearances with Borussia Mönchengladbach and eleven 2. Bundesliga appearances for SC Paderborn 07 retired due to an ankle injury.

Post-season

 Paul Freier, 34, midfielder for VfL Bochum and Bayer Leverkusen who earned 19 caps for Germany.
 Levan Kobiashvili, 36, defender for Hertha BSC, Schalke 04 and SC Freiburg who earned 100 caps for Georgia.
 Markus Krösche, 33, defender and captain for SC Paderborn 07.
 Stefan Kühne, 33, captain for Preußen Münster who also played for FC Carl Zeiss Jena, Holstein Kiel, and 1. FSV Mainz 05.
 Marcel Maltritz, 35, defender/midfielder for VfL Bochum, VfL Wolfsburg, Hamburger SV, and 1. FC Magdeburg.
 Daniel Van Buyten, 36, defender for Bayern Munich and Hamburger SV.

Sources

 
Seasons in German football